The Eastern and Midlands Railway was formed in 1881 by the amalgamation of several small railways in the Isle of Ely, Cambridgeshire, Lincolnshire and Norfolk, England, including the Yarmouth and North Norfolk Railway, the Lynn and Fakenham Railway and the Yarmouth Union Railway. Many of these lines were built by contractors Wilkinson and Jarvis. In 1893 the Eastern and Midlands Railway became part of the Midland and Great Northern Joint Railway.

Constituents
The constituents of the Eastern and Midlands Railway were:
 Peterborough, Wisbech and Sutton Bridge Railway, opened 1866
 Midland & Eastern Railway (incorporating Lynn and Sutton Bridge Railway, Norwich & Spalding Railway and Spalding & Bourne Railway)
 Lynn & Fakenham Railway
 Yarmouth & North Norfolk (Light) Railway (incorporating Great Yarmouth & Stalham Light Railway)
 Yarmouth Union Railway

Spelling variations
The spellings of some place names have changed since the 19th century (e.g. Wisbeach/Wisbech and Bourn/Bourne).

Routes
Westbound from Kings Lynn
 Sutton Bridge - Wisbech North - Peterborough
 Sutton Bridge - Spalding - Bourne

Eastbound from Kings Lynn
 Fakenham West - Melton Constable - Norwich City
 Fakenham West - Melton Constable - Yarmouth Beach

Locomotives
In 1884, William Marriott became the locomotive superintendent at the company's Melton Constable Railway Works. The railway's stock included:

 Two Fox, Walker 0-6-0ST locomotives (works numbers 338 and 339) which had been built for the Great Yarmouth and Stalham Light Railway in 1877. 
 Seven 4-4-0T locomotives built by Hudswell Clarke for the Lynn and Fakenham Railway between 1878 and 1881.
 Fifteen Beyer Peacock 4-4-0 locomotives built 1882-1888
 Four built for the  Lynn & Fakenham Railway
 Eleven built for the Eastern and Midlands Railway
 Eight Sharp Stewart 0-6-0T locomotives (ex-Cornwall Minerals Railway)

To the M&GN
The Eastern and Midlands Railway became a part of the Midland and Great Northern Joint Railway in 1893.

References

External links
 A 2-4-0 locomotive of the Eastern and Midlands Railway
 A 4-4-0T locomotive of the Eastern and Midlands Railway

Midland and Great Northern Joint Railway
Standard gauge railways in England
Rail transport in Norfolk